The 2000–01 Illinois Fighting Illini men's basketball team represented the University of Illinois at Urbana–Champaign in the 2000–01 NCAA Division I men's basketball season. Led by first year head coach Bill Self, the Illini played their home games at Assembly Hall in Champaign, Illinois and were members of the Big Ten Conference. They finished the season with a record of 27–8, 13–3 in Big Ten play to win a share of the Big Ten regular season title with Michigan State. They lost in the semifinals of the Big Ten tournament to Indiana. They received an at-large bid to the NCAA tournament as the No. 1 seed in the Midwest Region. They advanced to the Elite Eight before losing to Arizona.

Regular season
In May 2000, Lon Kruger left Illinois to become head coach of the NBA’s Atlanta Hawks. Bill Self was named Illinois’ 15th head men’s basketball coach on June 9, 2000. Self came to Illinois from Tulsa where he had led the Golden Hurricane to consecutive NCAA tournament appearances, including a 32–5 record and Tournament run to the Elite Eight in 2000. Self ’s first season at Illinois, was memorable. The Illini were ranked in the Top 10 the entire season and tied for the Big Ten Championship with Michigan State. The Illini defeated Purdue in the quarterfinals of the Big Ten tournament, but fell to Indiana in the semifinals.

The Illini received an at-large as a No. 1 seed in the Midwest Region of the NCAA Tournament. Easy wins over Northwestern State and Charlotte led to a trip to the Sweet Sixteen. The Illini defeated Kansas in the Sweet Sixteen to advance to the Elite Eight. However, the Illini run ended in the Elite Eight to eventual national runner-up Arizona, the third meeting between the two schools on the season. Sophomore Frank Williams became the first Illini player to earn Big Ten Player of the Year honors since 1967 and was named to several postseason All-America squads. Junior Cory Bradford set an NCAA record by making a three-point field goal in 88 consecutive games.

Roster

Source

Schedule and results

|-
!colspan=12 style="background:#; color:#;"|Non-conference regular season

	

|-
!colspan=9 style="background:#"|Big Ten regular season

|-
!colspan=9 style="background:#"|Big Ten tournament

|-
!colspan=9 style="background:#"|NCAA tournament

													

												
Source

Player stats

Awards and honors
 Frank Williams
Big Ten Player of the Year
Chicago Tribune Silver Basketball award
Wooden 1st team All-American 
National Association of Basketball Coaches 2nd team All-American
Associated Press 3rd team All-American
Team Most Valuable Player 
Fighting Illini All-Century team (2005)
Brian Cook
Fighting Illini All-Century team (2005)
Cory Bradford
Associated Press Honorable Mention All-American

Rankings

References

Illinois Fighting Illini
Illinois Fighting Illini men's basketball seasons
Illinois
2000 in sports in Illinois
2001 in sports in Illinois